Anderson Bay Provincial Park is a provincial park in British Columbia, Canada, located on the southeast end of Texada Island near the community of Gillies Bay.  Created in 2000, it is approximately 35 ha. in area.

History and conservation
The small island and peninsula are included in South Texada Island Provincial Park, but the head of the bay is private land.  The park aims to protect black-tailed deer, birds and intertidal life.

See also
Buccaneer Bay Provincial Park
South Texada Island Provincial Park

External links
Anderson Bay Provincial Park

Provincial parks of British Columbia
Texada Island
2000 establishments in British Columbia